Syrian cinema has existed since the early 20th century. The first Syrian film was Al Muttaham al Baree (The Innocent Suspect), released in 1928. Since the early 1960s, the film sector has been mainly managed by the National Organization for Cinema, a department of Ministry of Culture. The film industry blossomed in the 1960s, despite a significant shift toward nationalistic documentaries, and has continued to garner attention. Prominent filmmakers include Nazih Shabandar, Rasheed Jalal, and Qays al-Zubeydi.

History
In 1908, the first film ever screened in Syria was shown at a cafe in Aleppo. Eight years later, the Ottoman administration established the first film theater, in Damascus. The theater was inaugurated by the Ottoman governor, Jamal Pasha; however, it was burned down one month later. The French assumed mandate over Syria at the time, and many theaters were subsequently built in Damascus. The first Syrian film was Al Muttaham al Baree (The Innocent Suspect), a silent black-and-white feature released in 1928. The film was written, directed and produced by Rasheed Jalal, in association with Ahmed Tello. The crew set another precedent by forming the first Syrian production company: Hermon Film. In 1934, the second silent black-and-white film, Tahta Sama' Dimashq (Under the Damascus Sky), was released, coinciding with the Egyptian musical talkie, Unshudat al Fuad (Hymn of the Heart). The Syrian film became a commercial failure, as it was overshadowed by Unshudat al Fuad's success.  In 1943 the 1,500 seat Cinema Dimashq, one of the largest movie theaters ever constructed in the Eastern Mediterranean, opened in Damascus.

In 1947, Nazih Shabandar established a production studio filled with equipment he created. The following year, he produced the first Syrian talkie, Nur wa Thalam (Light and Darkness), written by Mohamed Shamel and Ali el-Arna'ut. The film was also significant because it featured several rising Syrian stars: Rafiq Shukri, Yevett Feghli, and Anwar el Baba.

Film production improved during the 1950s, but was still hindered by lackluster distribution. The 1960s saw significant improvements with Doreid Lahham and Nuhad al-Qala'i, a comedic duo, generating higher profit margins than their predecessors. Their first film was Aqd al-Lulu (Necklace of Pearls), released in 1965. Aqd al-Lulu was the first in a tightly linked series of comedy films from the duo. Thanks to ample profits, they were able to produce films at a rate of two per year. 

The 1960s also marked a period of transition for Syrian film-making. In 1963, the General Organization for Cinema was established as an arm of the Ministry of Culture to oversee the production and distribution of Syrian films. Due to the deaths of Arabs in the Six-Day War and Syria's loss of the Golan Heights, the government granted the General Organization for Cinema strict monopoly over the production and distribution of films. Consequently, the private film industry all but phased out by the end of the 1960s and early 1970s. The 1971 film, Imra' Min Nar (A Woman of Fire), and the 1973 film Zekra Lailat Hubb (Memory of a Night of Love), both films starring Salah Zulfikar, with almost a full Egyptian cast followed by 1973 films Al-Makhdūʿūn (The Dupes), marked the final box-office hits produced by the private sector. The government focused on films promoting Syrian advances in agriculture, health and transportation. Documentary films were produced in large numbers to promote the construction of infrastructure; the impact of agricultural reform; and the provision of public services. In other words, the Syrian cinema shifted from entertainment to propaganda. Iraqi film maker Qays al-Zubeydi produced multiple films documenting the struggles of Palestinian refugees. Films like Bai'dan 'an al-Watan (Far from their Country) and Shahadat al-Filastinyyin fi Zaman al-Harb (Testimonies of Palestinians in the Time of War), released in 1970 and 1972 respectively, circulated around the Arab world to influence the masses. The first fictional movie produced by the General Organization for Cinema was Sa'eq al-Shahinah (The Truck Driver), directed by Yugoslavian film maker Poçko Fockovic and released in 1967.

See also
 Cinema of the world
 List of Syrian films

References

External links
Arab Cinema BEGINNINGS AND LANDMARKS